Arturito is a Spanish diminutive for the masculine name Arturo. It may refer to:

 TR Araña, a robot which is claimed to remotely analyse the composition of the ground 
 R2-D2, a Star Wars character, dubbed in Latin Spanish as "Arturito"
 Arturo Godoy, a Chilean boxer
 A ticket vending machine at the Medellín Metro
 Arturo Román, a character on Netflix TV series Money Heist